is a JR West Kabe Line station located in Gion, Asaminami-ku, Hiroshima, Hiroshima Prefecture, Japan. The station name on the building uses an older kanji for the "gi", but in most current publications it is listed as 祗 or 祇).

Station layout
Shimo-Gion Station features one island platform serving two tracks. The station building is to the north-east of the platforms, and are connected together by a railway crossing. Access to the platforms is restricted with ticket gates. A ticket office is available at this station.

Platforms

History
 1909-11-19: Shimo-Gion Station opens 
 1987-04-01: Japanese National Railways is privatized, and Shimo-Gion Station becomes a JR West station

Surrounding Area
 Japan National Route 54
Hiroshima Asaminami Post Office
Hiroshima Naka-Gion Post Office
Kobelco Construction Machinery (formerly Yutani Heavy Industries)
Yume Town Gion
Hiroshima Municipal Gion Elementary School
Hiroshima Municipal Hara Elementary School
Hiroshima Municipal Yamamoto Elementary School
Hiroshima Municipal Gion Junior High School
AICJ Junior High School
AICJ High School
Ōshimo Gakuen Gion High School
Hiroshima University of Economics, including Hiroshima Economics Library
Hesaka Station, on the JR West Geibi Line

External links

 JR West

Kabe Line
Hiroshima City Network
Stations of West Japan Railway Company in Hiroshima city
Railway stations in Japan opened in 1909